Alexander and Company, Limited, often simply called Alexander and Co., was an Agency House in British India founded by traders and merchants from Scotland. Alexander and Co. has made several pioneering contributions to the economy of India. Alexander and Co. was the promoter and founder of India's very first bank, the Bank of Hindostan.

History

Background 

Before the advent of joint-stock banking companies in India, the role of banks was played by agency houses. The agency houses performed various quasi-banking functions which included but were not limited to:

 Accepting deposits (Agency houses accepted deposits only from British nationals and other Europeans)
 Financing trade
 Lending of money (primarily to the Government)

Business 

After their initial success, the agency houses started lending money to European entrepreneurs in India and not just the Government. The Alexander and Co. agency house also lent money to several European entrepreneurs, the most notable among them was Josiah Marshall Heath, an English metallurgist who owned several mining ventures in British India.

An amount of Rupees 100,000 had been loaned to Josiah Marshall Heath by the Alexander and Co. agency house in order to finance his mining related ventures. He used the sum to start the Porto Novo Steel and Iron Company. By 1832, he was unable to repay the debt, and this contributed to the failure of the Alexander and Co. agency house.

Bank of Hindostan 

After having experimented with lending and other banking activities, the Alexander and Co. agency house separated its banking activities and divested it into a separate banking company which was named the Bank of Hindostan. The Bank of Hindostan was notable for being one of the oldest banks in India.

Failure 

The Alexander and Co. agency house failed in the year 1832 due to major economic downturn affecting the British India. The main cause of the economic crisis was the unexpected fall in the prices of commodities such as Indigo. As a result and consequence of its failure, the Bank of Hindostan also failed and had to be liquidated in the very same year.

Legacy 

The legacy of the Alexander and Co. and its role in shaping the economic fortunes of India have been widely recognized. It has been credited as a major pioneer in the history of Banking in India.

The failure of the early Indian financial firms also led to the passing of the Companies Act, 1860 which granted limited liability to banking companies. Many of the early Indian Banks had been partnership firms with unlimited liability.

See also

 Banking in India
 Economy of India under Company rule
 Company rule in India

References

External links 
 THE RISE OF THE BRITISH MANAGING AGENCIES IN NORTH EASTERN INDIA 1836-1918

Economic history of India
Trading companies of the United Kingdom
Companies based in Kolkata